The God Machine may refer to:

The God Machine (novel), a 1968 novel by Martin Caidin
The God Machine (band), a US/UK rock band
The God Machine (comedic prop), a comedic prop featured in the "This Week in God" segments on The Daily Show with Jon Stewart
The God Machine (comics), a 2008 comic book series from Archaia Studios Press
The God Machine, a 2009 novel by J. G. Sandom
The God Machine, a 1973 novel by William John Watkins
The God-Machine Chronicle, a sourcebook for the World of Darkness role-playing games
"God Machine", a song by Acid Bath from When the Kite String Pops
The God Machine (album), a studio album by the German power metal band Blind Guardian, released in September 2022
Thegodmachine, studio album by the American metalcore band Phinehas, released in September 2011

See also
Deus ex machina, a plot device that originated in the drama of Ancient Greece
God helmet, an experimental apparatus developed by Stanley Koren and Michael Persinger